Lee Yeon-ju (born 19 January 1964) is a South Korean speed skater. She competed in three events at the 1984 Winter Olympics.

References

External links
 

1964 births
Living people
South Korean female speed skaters
Olympic speed skaters of South Korea
Speed skaters at the 1984 Winter Olympics
People from Chuncheon
Sportspeople from Gangwon Province, South Korea
20th-century South Korean women